WRAZ-FM (106.3 FM, Salsa 106.3) is a radio station broadcasting a salsa music format. Licensed to Leisure City, Florida, United States.  The station is currently owned by South Broadcasting System, Inc. It is operated by Spanish Broadcasting System under a local marketing agreement.

History
The station went on the air as WVBH on November 21, 1985.  On October 2, 1989, the station changed its call sign to WZMQ; on February 15, 1999, to WXTF; on March 2, 1999, back to WZMQ; on March 22, 2000, to WRAU; on July 1, 2001, to WZMQ once again; and on January 22, 2008, to the current WRAZ. 106.3 La Raza, Cima 106.3, La Nueva 106.3, Tu Bacana 106.3, Salsa 106.3

On November 25, 2021, WRAZ-FM changed their format from Latin to salsa, branded as "Salsa 106.3".

References

External links

Mexican-American culture in Florida
RAZ-FM
Spanish Broadcasting System radio stations
RAZ-FM
1985 establishments in Florida
Radio stations established in 1985